Mizukoshi (written 水越) is a Japanese surname. Notable people with the surname include:

, Japanese footballer and manager
, Japanese photographer

Japanese-language surnames